A Bookshelf on Top of the Sky: 12 Stories About John Zorn is a documentary film on avant garde composer and musician John Zorn directed by Claudia Heuermann. It features performances of a range of Zorn's music and includes appearances by  Joey Baron, Greg Cohen, Dave Douglas, Fred Frith, Ikue Mori, Mike Patton, and Marc Ribot. It won the Bavarian Documentary Award in 2002.

References

External links 
 

John Zorn
Documentary films about music and musicians
2000s English-language films